The English Review was a London literary magazine launched in 1783 by John Murray I, under the full title English Review, or Abstract of English and Foreign Literature. Its editor was Gilbert Stuart.

Initially Stuart wrote much of the Review with William Thomson. He died in 1786. Thomson carried it on, becoming proprietor in 1794. In 1796 the English Review was merged into the Analytical Review.

Contributors 
Some notable contributors to the magazine were:

References 

1783 establishments in Great Britain
1796 disestablishments in Great Britain
Defunct literary magazines published in the United Kingdom
Magazines published in England
Magazines established in 1783
Magazines disestablished in 1796
Magazines published in London